is a professional Japanese baseball player. He plays catcher for the Tohoku Rakuten Golden Eagles.

References 

1996 births
Living people
Baseball people from Okayama Prefecture
Japanese baseball players
Nippon Professional Baseball catchers
Tohoku Rakuten Golden Eagles players